Francisco Domínguez Servién (born 11 August 1966) is a Mexican politician affiliated with the National Action Party (PAN). He  served as Governor of Querétaro from 2016 to 2021. Previously, he also served as Senator of the LXII Legislature of the Mexican Congress representing Querétaro and Deputy during the LX Legislature.

In March 2020 he tested positive for COVID-19, from which he later recovered.

Governor Domínguez Servién was accused by Emilio Lozoya Austin, former director of Pemex, in July 2020 of receiving bribes in 2013-2014 to support energy reform legislation. Domínguez Servién fired his secretary, Guillermo Gutiérrez Badillo in August after the latter and a senator appeared on a video receiving money from a director of Pemex. The governor denied having previous knowledge of the incident.

See also
 List of presidents of Querétaro Municipality

References

1966 births
Living people
Politicians from Querétaro
Members of the Senate of the Republic (Mexico)
Members of the Chamber of Deputies (Mexico)
National Action Party (Mexico) politicians
Governors of Querétaro
21st-century Mexican politicians
Autonomous University of Queretaro alumni
Municipal presidents of Querétaro